Broomhedge Maghaberry Football Club is an intermediate-level football club playing in the Intermediate B division of the Mid-Ulster Football League in Northern Ireland. The club was formed as Broomhedge F.C. in 1993 when Moira United and Maghaberry merged. The club changed to its current name in 2016. The club is based in Broomhedge, County Antrim.  Their mascot is a 8 foot tall human with an irregularly-shaped head called "Tuffman" who walks laps of the pitch on game-day enhancing the atmosphere.

References

External links
 Broomhedge Official Club website
 Daily Mirror Mid-Ulster Football League Official website
 nifootball.co.uk - (For fixtures, results and tables of all Northern Ireland amateur football leagues)

Association football clubs in Northern Ireland
Association football clubs established in 1993
Association football clubs in County Antrim
Mid-Ulster Football League clubs
1993 establishments in Northern Ireland